Cerro Lípez (also Cerro Lipez) is a stratovolcano in the Cordillera de Lípez in the Sud Lípez Province of the  Potosí Department in southwestern Bolivia. It has twin peaks and rises to 5,933 m. On some maps it is incorrectly labeled as Nuevo Mundo. Nuevo Mundo is in fact hundreds of kilometres to the northeast and five hundred metres shorter. The confusion came in part from a misidentification of the height of Nuevo Mundo.

See also
List of volcanoes in Bolivia

Notes

Stratovolcanoes of Bolivia
Volcanoes of Potosí Department
Five-thousanders of the Andes